The Arab Volleyball Championship is a sport competition for national teams, currently held biannually and organized by the AVA, the Arab Volleyball Association.

The first Arab Championships were held in 1977 in Kuwait.

Results

Summary

Total Hosts

Medal table

Participating nations

References
  Arab volleyball championship from 1977 to 2012 (Tunisian Volleyball Federation)

External links
 Official AVA website
 abdogedeon.com

 
Recurring sporting events established in 1977
Volleyball in the Arab world